The Air Command Commander is an American autogyro that was designed and produced by Air Command International, with its first flight in 1984. Production was completed by 2003. The aircraft was supplied as a kit for amateur construction.

Design and development
It features a single main rotor, a single-seat open cockpit without a windshield, tricycle landing gear and a single engine in pusher configuration.

The aircraft fuselage is made from bolted-together 6061-T6 aluminum tubing that is supplied anodized and pre-drilled. Its  diameter rotor comes completely assembled.

The aircraft takes 40 hours to assemble from the factory kit. Original factory options included a cockpit fairing, wheels brakes, wheel pants, rotor brake and a main rotor pre-rotator, although the installation of any of these options will raise the empty weight above US FAR 103 limits for ultralight vehicles.

The aircraft can be readily loaded on a simple trailer for ground transportation.

Reviewer Andre Cliche said of the aircraft:

Variants
Commander 447
Main version equipped with a single  twin cylinder, air-cooled, two-stroke single-ignition Rotax 447 engine

Specifications (Commander 447)

See also
List of rotorcraft

References

Commander
1980s United States sport aircraft
Homebuilt aircraft
Single-engined pusher autogyros